The Turkey men's national 3x3 team represents Turkey in international 3x3 (3 against 3) basketball competitions organized by FIBA. It is governed by the Turkish Basketball Federation. (TBF)

See also
 Turkey national basketball team

Squad
Mehmet Fırat Alemdaroğlu
Mert Başdan
Tanalp Şengün
Utku Saraloğlu

Participations

Mediterranean Games

See also
Men's

 Turkey Men's national basketball team
 Turkey Men's national basketball team U20
 Turkey Men's national basketball team U18 and U19
 Turkey Men's national basketball team U16 and U17

Women's

 Turkey Women's national basketball team
 Turkey Women's national basketball team U20
 Turkey Women's national basketball team U18 and U19
 Turkey Women's national basketball team U16 and U17
 Turkey Women's national 3x3 team

References

External links
Official website 
Archived records of Turkey team participations

Men's national 3x3 basketball teams
3x3